Cigarettes, Whiskey and Wild Women (French: Cigarettes, Whisky et P'tites Pépées) is a 1959 French comedy film directed by Maurice Régamey and starring Jean Carmet and Annie Cordy.

Premise 
To bail out their club on the French Riviera, a group of young and pretty sportswomen do not hesitate to exploit whiskey and cigarettes found in the cellar during resounding celebrations.

Cast 

 Jean Carmet as Martial
 Annie Cordy as Martine
 René Havard as Fernand
 Pierre Mondy as Max
 Pierre Doris as Gustave
 Franco Interlenghi as Mario
 Reinhard Kolldehoff as Van Dorfelt
 Alessandra Panaro as Micheline
 Sylvie Adassa as Michèle
 Armande Navarre as Juliette
 Nadine Tallier as Arlette
 Micheline Gary as Véronique
 Gisèle Grimm as Élisabeth
 Christian Méry as Angelo
 Arielle Coignet as Isabelle
 Dominique Darsac as Jacqueline
 Pierre Mirat as Abadie
 Jean Richard as The client
 Albert Rémy as The customs
 Pierre Moncorbier as The notary
 Jeanne Valérie

Production 
The film was shot from 30 June to 13 August 1958.

The film was released in Italy 10 February 1959, in France, 25 February 1959, in Sweden, 16 November 1959 and in Germany, 4 March 1960.

The film is most known from the 1947 song "Cigarettes, Whisky et P'tites Pépées" ("Cigarettes, Whisky, And Wild, Wild Women" music by Tim Spencer, French lyrics by Jacques Soumet and François Llenas) singing by Annie Cordy.

References

External links 
 

1959 films
1950s French-language films
1959 comedy films
French comedy films
Films directed by Maurice Régamey
1950s French films